Straight Ahead (known as N.Y.C. Mayhem in 1985) was an American straight edge hardcore punk band formed in Queens, New York City, in 1984, by drummer and vocalist Tommy Carroll, guitarist Gordon Ancis and bassist Tony Marc Shimkin.

History 
Straight Ahead were formed by former-Assault guitarist and bassist Gordon Ancis and Tony Marc Shimkin along with drummer and vocalist Tommy Carroll, who had previously played in Corrupt, in 1984, the band would then change their name to "N.Y.C. Mayhem" in 1985, release their debut demo tape "Mayhemic Destruction" and then replace Shimkin with Craig Setari. Late-1985 saw the release of their debut EP "We Stand" and the band's first breakup, in which Carrol and Setari would join Youth of Today.

N.Y.C. Mayhem reformed in 1986, back under their previous moniker "Straight Ahead", this time with Rob Echeverria on guitar, instead of Gordon Ancis. This lineup would record a 7-inch as a three-piece, before recruiting Armand Majidi on drums, having Carroll move over to only vocals.

They played their final gig on May 3, 1987, playing one reunion gig in 1988 at the "For Pete's Sake" benefit, after which Carroll was rarely seen, if ever.

Musical style and legacy 
Straight Ahead are considered a hardcore punk band, more specifically, their work as N.Y.C. Mayhem has been categorised as the subgenre thrashcore and some of their songs as an early form of death metal. whereas their post-1986 work is considered crossover thrash. The band's earliest influences were Black Sabbath, Iron Maiden, Metallica and Judas Priest However, in the following years, they became one of the earliest bands to blur the lines between punk rock and heavy metal, with their style being just as much indebted to extreme metal bands like Venom and Slayer as it was to Void, Necros and Negative Approach. The band have also been cited as referring to their own music as "deathcore" as early as 1985. Bernard Doe of Metal Forces magazine referred to them as "the fastest band around".

Straight Ahead (specifically their output as N.Y.C. Mayhem) was a significant influence on Stormtroopers of Death, as well as the genres of death metal, grindcore and black metal due to early use of death growls and heavy riffing on tracks from 1985's "We Stand" such as "Necropolis (City Of The Dead)" and "Deathwish". Jeffrey Walker of English band Carcass has cited N.Y.C. Mayhem as a major influence on the band's early grindcore sound, Shane Embury (later of Napalm Death) and Mitch Dickinson (later of Heresy)'s band Warhammer were heavily influenced by N.Y.C. Mayhem's early demo tapes, according to Matt Olivo of grindcore band Repulsion, N.Y.C. Mayhem were one of the bands that inspired them to play at the speed they did and American grindcore band Brutal Truth covered Straight Ahead's song "White Clam Sauce" on their 2011 album "End Time". Charlie Benante of Anthrax has said that the first time that he ever heard blast beats was from one of N.Y.C. Mayhem's demo tapes, inspiring him to learn the technique himself. Heavy metal band Prong played their first gig on November 23, 1986, in support of Straight Ahead and Nausea. Tom Capone, guitarist of Quicksand, has cited N.Y.C. Mayhem as one of his favorite bands in the world.

Original bass player Tony Marc Shimkin has worked with artists such as Madonna, on her 1992 album Erotica. The band's vocalist, Tommy Carroll, went on to be the drummer in Youth of Today and vocalist of Irate. Original guitarist Gordon Ancis went on to found pioneering death metal band Hellhouse in 1985, as well as Zero Hour, which included ex-Whiplash guitarist Tony Scaglione, Massacre guitarist Rob Goodwin and Deathrash bassist Pat Burns. Ancis also played in New York crossover thrash band Leeway and hardcore punk band Agnostic Front. Bassist Craig Setari has played bass for New York hardcore punk band Sick of It All since 1992, along with drummer Armand Majidi. Setari has also played with Youth of Today, Agnostic Front and Cro-Mags. Guitarist Rob Echeverria joined Helmet and eventually Biohazard. Echeverria, Majidi and Setari also all played in hardcore punk band Rest in Pieces.

Members 
Final lineup
Tommy Carroll – lead vocals (1984–1985; 1986–1987; 1988), drums (1984–1985; 1986–1987)
Rob Echeverria – guitar (1986–1987; 1988)
Craig Setari –  bass (1985; 1986–1987; 1988)
Armand Majidi – drums (1987; 1988)

Past members
Gordon Ancis – guitar (1984–1985)
Tony Marc Shimkin – bass (1984–1985)

Timeline

Discography 
EPs
We Stand (1985)
Breakaway (1987)

Demos
Mayhemic Destruction (1985)
Violence (1985)

Live demos
CBGB 3/16/86 (1986)
Albany 6/22/86 (1986)
CBGB 7/20/86 (1986)
CBGB 3/21/87 (1987)
CBGB 5/3/87 (1987)

Compilations
The Metal Days / The Crossover Days (2011)
For Real! (2014)

References 

Crossover thrash groups
Hardcore punk groups from New York (state)
Musical groups from Queens, New York
Musical groups established in 1984
Musical groups reestablished in 1986
Musical groups reestablished in 1988
Straight edge groups